Joseph Verrengia (born February 9, 1964) is an American politician who served in the Connecticut House of Representatives from the 20th district from 2011 to 2021.

References

1964 births
Living people
Democratic Party members of the Connecticut House of Representatives
21st-century American politicians